Goizeder Victoria Azúa Barríos (born February 23, 1984) is a Venezuelan television host, anchorwoman, model, journalist, and beauty queen who won Miss International 2003.

Career

Miss Venezuela 2002
She began her beauty pageant career by winning the Miss Carabobo 2002 title, and then by winning the Miss Venezuela World 2002 crown in the Gala de la Belleza preliminary competition of Miss Venezuela 2002.

Miss World 2002
Azúa represented Venezuela in the Miss World 2002 pageant, where she placed in the top 10.

Miss Mesoamerica 2003
Azúa prior her participation at Miss International 2003 pageant, went to Miss Mesoamerica 2003 in Las Vegas, where she won the crown.

Miss International 2003
Azúa was appointed to represent Venezuela in the Miss International 2003 pageant, where she won the crown. Her win marked the fourth of eight victories of Venezuela in Miss International, the most of any nation.

Life after Miss International 2003
Once considered Venezuela's top fashion model, Azúa worked on Globovision as a journalist. She had her own TV program called Fun Race. She worked on Televen as anchorwoman and now she is based in Spain.  She is married and has 2 sons.

References

External links
 Web Site Oficial del Miss Venezuela
 Goizeder Azua @ Bellas Venezolanas

1984 births
Living people
Miss Venezuela International winners
Miss International 2003 delegates
Miss International winners
Miss World 2002 delegates
People from Valencia, Venezuela
Venezuelan people of Basque descent
Venezuelan female models
Venezuelan television presenters
Venezuelan television personalities
Venezuelan women journalists
Venezuelan women television presenters
Venezuelan beauty pageant winners
People from San Felipe, Venezuela